Russwood Park was a stadium in Memphis, Tennessee. It was primarily used for baseball and was the home of the Memphis Chicks minor league baseball team until the spring of 1960. The ballpark was originally built in 1896, and was known as Elm Wood Park or Red Elm Park. In 1915, team owner Russell E. Garner incorporated his name into the ballpark's name.  The "wood" part of the name would figure into its demise.

Prior to its dramatic end, the ballpark was best known for being among the more uniquely shaped ballfields in the country. As with Nashville's Sulphur Dell, it was in a natural "bowl". The slopes were used as convenient foundations for seating areas. Constrained by its topography, a creek, and pre-existing buildings, the park was on an asymmetrical lot, with the deepest parts of left and right fields being significantly farther from home plate than straightaway center.

City directories gave its street address as 914 Madison Avenue. Its boundary streets included Madison (south, home plate); Dunlap Street (west, left field); and Jefferson Avenue beyond bordering buildings (north, center field). The creek (later covered to make a parking lot) ran outside the right field fence. The left field distance was later shortened somewhat by construction of an inner fence and bleachers.

It was also the home field for the Memphis Tigers football team from 1912-1928 when they were known as the West Tennessee State Normal School and the West Tennessee State Teachers College.

One of its better-known non-baseball events was a concert held by Memphis' adoptive son Elvis Presley on July 4, 1956. Coincidentally, 21 years later Elvis would be pronounced dead at the Baptist Hospital across Madison Street to the south.

The largest crowd attendance for wrestling in Memphis was set on August 17, 1959 at Russwood Park. The main event was Billy Wicks and Sputnik Monroe fighting to a no contest for Monroe's Tennessee Championship. Attendance for the event has been reported to be between 17,000 and 18,000. The record would stand until the Monday Night Wars Era.

The final event at the old ballpark was a pre-season exhibition game between the Chicago White Sox and the Cleveland Indians on Easter Sunday, April 17, 1960. A reported 7,279 fans watched the Indians beat the White Sox, 2-1.

The ballpark was a relic, constructed primarily of wood except for steel supports for the roof. That night after the game, a fire of undetermined origin destroyed the ballpark. The blaze threatened the Baptist Hospital across the street from it, and patients had to be evacuated.

The Chicks played in several temporary facilities for the 1960 season, including a very cramped high school football field a couple of blocks northeast of the ballpark site, called Hodges Field; and then a city-owned field called Tobey Park. After the season, the club moved to Macon, Georgia. As it happens, the entire Southern Association disbanded after the 1961 season. A revived minor league entry for the city, called the Memphis Blues, began play in 1968 at Tim McCarver Stadium.

Sources
Baseball Parks of North America by Michael Benson, 1989.

References

External links
 Photos of the ballpark (for reference only)
 Photo of ballpark plaque
 A fan's reminscence of the final game
 A list of minor league tenants
 Russwood Park at Historic-memphis.com
  and  1952 Sanborn maps showing Russwood Park

Defunct college football venues
Defunct minor league baseball venues
Tennessee Docs football
American football venues in Tennessee
Baseball venues in Tennessee
Sports venues in Memphis, Tennessee
1896 establishments in Tennessee
1960 disestablishments in Tennessee
Sports venues demolished in 1960